Byahaut Bat Cave is a coastal cave in the Caribbean Island of St. Vincent on the Western Coast.

The cave is a local landmark for boats organising Diving and snorkel trips for tourists.

The cave is believed to contain a large and noisy bat population.

Natural history of Saint Vincent and the Grenadines
Caves of Saint Vincent and the Grenadines
Caves of the Caribbean